The 1913 FA Cup final was contested by Aston Villa and Sunderland on 19 April 1913 at London's Crystal Palace. Playing as the home side, Aston Villa won 1–0 on a goal by Tommy Barber on a crossed ball from Charlie Wallace. Wallace had earlier missed a penalty, something that would not occur again in an FA Cup final until the 1988 final between Wimbledon and Liverpool.

It was Sunderland's first appearance in the FA Cup Final and the first time The Football League's top two finishers had vied for the trophy (even though the League would not be decided for another week). On their way to the match Sunderland had to replay their quarter-final twice and then their semi-final once after draws in those contests. Aston Villa was re-appearing in the final after an eight-year absence and their victory was their fifth, equalling the then-current record of the Wanderers and Blackburn Rovers.

During the match Sunderland's Charlie Thomson and Villa's Harry Hampton almost immediately resumed a long-running feud that led to both players being suspended for a month at the start of the following season. The contest was noted for its rough play and led to the withdrawal of Sunderland's invitation to take part in the 1913 Charity Shield match. Referee Mr. A. Adams from Nottingham was also suspended, having allowed no less than 17 minutes for stoppage time.

Route to the final

Match details

References
 Line ups
 FA Cup Final kits

1913
FA Cup
Aston Villa F.C. matches
Sunderland A.F.C. matches
April 1913 sports events
1913 sports events in London